The Battle of Morat was a battle in the Burgundian Wars (1474–77) that was fought on 22 June 1476 between Charles the Bold, the Duke of Burgundy, and a Swiss Confederate army at Morat/Murten, about 30 kilometres from Bern. The result was a crushing defeat for the Burgundians at the hands of the Swiss.

Background
Stung by his defeat by the Swiss Confederation at Grandson in March 1476, Charles the Bold, Duke of Burgundy, reorganised his tangled but otherwise mainly intact army at Lausanne. By the end of May he once again felt ready to march against the Confederates to recover his territories and fortifications in the Pays de Vaud, then march on and attack the city of Berne, his greatest enemy among the Swiss cantons.

His first objective was the strategic lakeside town of Morat, set on the eastern shore of Lake Morat. On 11 June 1476, the Burgundians commenced the siege of the well-prepared town, whose forces were commanded by the Bernese general Adrian von Bubenberg. An initial assault was repulsed by a heavy barrage of fire from light guns mounted on the walls, but two great bombards used by the Burgundians were slowly reducing the walls to rubble. By 19 June the Confederate muster was near complete at their camp behind the Sarine (Saane) River. Only a contingent of some 4,000 men from Zürich had yet to arrive and these were not expected until 22 June.

Charles in the meantime had been kept reasonably well informed of the approach of the Confederate army, though he did nothing to hinder their approach. The terrain around the town is quite hilly and he had chosen to rest his left flank artillery on a steeply sloped gorge cut by the Burggraben stream. In the centre, behind an elaborate ditch and palisade entrenchment known as the Grunhag, stood the bulk of Charles' infantry and artillery that were not engaged in besieging Murten itself. These were to fight the Confederation pike and halberd blocks to a halt while on the right the massed gendarmes would then flank the frontally engaged Swiss, thus creating a killing ground from which there was no escape.

On 21 June 1476, Charles expected the Confederation forces to attack. He arranged his army and prepared for the coming assault. However, the Swiss commanders decided to wait an additional day for the troops from Zürich. After about six hours of waiting Charles ordered his troops to stand down and return to camp.

Battle

On 22 June 1476, around mid-morning, Charles ordered his treasurer to pay the entire army, expecting the Confederate troops to continue delaying. The orderly lines of the Burgundian army dissolved into chaos as soldiers scattered throughout the camp collecting their pay, eating their midday meal, and seeking shelter from the rain. The Confederate vanguard of some 6,000 skirmishers and all the 1,200 cavalry present erupted out of Birchenwald Woods to the west of Morat, exactly where Charles had predicted they would appear.

Behind the vanguard came the main body of pikemen, the gewalthut (centre). Some 10,000 to 12,000 strong, they formed a large wedge with the canton standards in the centre, flanked by halberdiers and an outer ring of pikemen. The rearguard of 6,000 to 8,000 more closely packed pikemen and halberdiers followed the gewalthut towards the now sparsely manned Grunhag.

As the Swiss charged downhill into the Burgundian position the artillery managed to fire a few salvoes, killing or maiming several hundred of the overeager Lorrainers. Against the odds the defenders in the Grunhag held the Swiss for some time before a contingent of Swiss found a way through the left flank of the defences near the Burggraben and turned the whole position. The Swiss formed up quickly beyond it and advanced towards Morat and the besieger's camp.

In the Burgundian camp, there was confusion after the Swiss were sighted, as men rushed to re-form ranks and prepare for battle. In the ducal tent on top of the Bois Du Domingue, a hill overlooking Morat, Charles was quickly armed by his retainers before rushing on horseback to try to coordinate the defence of the camp. But as fast as any unit was formed and moved forward against the Swiss, it was swept aside as various uncoordinated attacks were made against the still compact Confederate battle formations. There was some resistance from the squadrons of the ducal household who routed the Lorrainers, including René II, Duke of Lorraine, who was saved only by the arrival of the pikes, against which the gendarmes could only retire, unable to make any impression against them.

Charles managed to muster enough English archers to form a last line of defence before the camp, but these were routed before a bow could be bent, their commander shot by a Swiss skirmisher. Traditionally, the Duke of Somerset is identified as the commander of the English archers. However, the only Duke of Somerset, Edmund Beaufort who was known to have been in Burgundian service died in 1471 at Tewkesbury in England and therefore could not have been at Murten five years later. Then it was every man for himself as Charles ordered the army to fall back which was interpreted as a retreat, which in turn became a rout as all organized resistance ended.

For some three miles along the lakeside many Burgundians died that day in the rout. The Italian division of some 4,000–6,000 men besieging the southern part of Morat probably suffered the worst fate: cut off by the Swiss rearguard and attacked by a sally from the town, they were hunted down along the shore and driven into the lake. As promised, no quarter was granted.

More fortunate was the Savoyard division under Jacques of Savoy, Count of Romont which was posted in the northern half of the Morat siege works. Forming up and abandoning all their baggage they retreated north and west round the lake and eventually made good their escape to Romont.

Part of the war booty captured at this battle is still retained at the castle of Gruyères in Switzerland, and includes three capes of the Order of the Golden Fleece which belonged to Charles the Bold, including one with the emblem of his father, Philip the Good, which he had with him as he was marking the anniversary of the death of his father.

Aftermath
The French poet and chronicler Jean Molinet reported that Charles' army lost about 6,000 to 7,000 men. Later writers have calculated a higher number, between 9,000 and 10,000.

Charles’ dream of revenge against the Confederates ended that day. Although he would doggedly struggle for another six months against his foes, his defeat at Morat really spelled the beginning of the end for the Burgundian State, much to the delight of the duke's enemies. Charles escaped to Morges, and then to Pontarlier, where he stayed for months, reportedly in a deep depression. He later returned to the battlefield at the Battle of Nancy, where he was killed.

Pockmarks from the Burgundian cannon can still be seen in the defensive towers of Morat.

Citation
Lord Byron in Canto III of Childe Harold's Pilgrimage has these words on the battle:

63
But ere these matchless heights I dare to scan,
There is a spot should not be pass'd in vain,--
Morat! the proud, the patriot field! where man
May gaze on ghastly trophies of the slain,
Nor blush for those who conquered on that plain;
Here Burgundy bequeath'd his tombless host,
A bony heap, through ages to remain,
Themselves their monument;--the Stygian coast
Unsepulchred they roam'd, and shriek'd each wandering ghost.

64
While Waterloo with Cannae's carnage vies,
Morat and Marathon twin names shall stand;
They were true Glory's stainless victories,
Won by the unambitious heart and hand
Of a proud, brotherly, and civic band,
All unbought champions in no princely cause
Of vice-entail'd Corruption; they no land
Doom'd to bewail the blasphemy of laws
Making kings' rights divine, by some Draconic clause.

See also
Battles of the Old Swiss Confederacy

References

Further reading
 
 Winkler, Albert (2010). "The Battle of Murten: The Invasion of Charles the Bold and the Survival of the Swiss States," Swiss American Historical Society Review, vol.46, no. 1, pp. 8–34.

External links
Panorama of the Battle of Morat
The panorama of the battle of Murten, official site

Morat 1476
Morat 1476
Conflicts in 1476
Murten
15th century in the Old Swiss Confederacy
1470s in the Holy Roman Empire
1476 in Europe